The Yser Testament, officially entitled Open Letter to the King of the Belgians Albert I, was an 11-page open letter addressed to King Albert I and published on 11 July 1917 during World War I. The letter's author, the philologist , set out a number of grievances relating to the treatment of the Flemish within the Belgian Army fighting on the Yser Front during World War I, especially concerning the perceived inequality of French and Dutch languages. It demanded that new legislation to equalise the status of the two languages be introduced after the war. The letter was the most famous action of the Frontbeweging and is considered an important moment in the history of the Flemish Movement.

The letter expressed loyalty to Albert I and demanded autonomy, rather than independence, for Flanders within a Belgian framework. It nonetheless provoked an angry reaction from the High Command which viewed the letter as subversive. Within German-occupied Belgium, a large faction of the Flemish Movement were collaborating with the German authorities as part of the Flamenpolitik and the letter defended their actions. In the aftermath of the letter's publication, Flemish Movement ideas spread among ordinary Flemish soldiers for the first time, leading to growing unrest. Armand De Ceuninck was appointed to Minister of War in August to restore discipline.

References

Notes

Bibliography

Further reading

Belgium in World War I
1917 in Belgium
Flemish Movement
Open letters
1917 documents